Swastika Dutta (born 23 April) known mononymously as Swastika, is an Indian Bengali actress who works in Bengali cinema. She made her debut in 2015 Bengali film  Parbona Ami Chartey Tokey. She is known for her role as Dali in the comedy TV serial Bhojo Gobindo (2017), as Keka in the serial Bijoyinee (2018), and as Radhika in Ki Kore Bolbo Tomay (2019).

Career
Dutta participated in FFACE as a model before starting her acting career. Her debut film was  Parbona Ami Chartey Tokey directed by Raj Chakraborty. Her debut in television was Dugga Dugga 2015 serial, as Tara which was telecasted on  Star Jalsha. In 2017 her role as Dali in Star Jalsha serial Bhojo Gobindo opposite Rohan Bhattacharya provided her the Best Style Icon 2018 Star Jalsha Parivaar Award.

Filmography

Web series

Television

Mahalaya

References

External links 
 

Living people
Bengali actresses
Actresses in Bengali cinema
21st-century Indian actresses
Indian film actresses
Indian television actresses
Year of birth missing (living people)